Willian Xavier Barbosa, known simply as Willian, (born 22 September 1983) is a Brazilian footballer who plays as a forward for Botafogo (SP).

Club career
Willian signed a new 3-year contract with Atlético Paranaense in 2003

In 2005, he left for Rio de Janeiro club America. In mid-2005 he was signed by Vasco da Gama in short-term contract. He made his Campeonato Brasileiro Série A debut for Vasco. In mid-2006 he left for Botafogo. In January 2007 he was loaned to a Japanese club on loan. He wore no. 11 shirt. However he only played and released on 17 July.

In summer 2008, he was transferred to the Belgian club K.V. Kortrijk which plays in the Belgian first division.

He returned to Brazil in 2010. In mid-2010 he signed a 2-year contract with Santo André, however he broken his leg against Guaratinguetá. Later Guaratinguetá player Júlio César was suspended for 180 days.

References

External links

 
 
 http://www.netvasco.com.br/versao10/futebol/jogadores/72.shtml

1983 births
Living people
People from Campo Grande
Brazilian footballers
Brazilian expatriate footballers
Campeonato Brasileiro Série A players
Botafogo de Futebol e Regatas players
CR Vasco da Gama players
Club Athletico Paranaense players
Clube Atlético Votuporanguense players
Rio Branco Esporte Clube players
Figueirense FC players
Expatriate footballers in Japan
Vegalta Sendai players
Associação Portuguesa de Desportos players
Botafogo Futebol Clube (SP) players
J2 League players
K.V. Kortrijk players
Belgian Pro League players
Expatriate footballers in Belgium
Brazilian expatriate sportspeople in Belgium
Association football forwards
Sportspeople from Mato Grosso do Sul